Igor Śmiałowski (20 June 1917, in Moscow, Russia – 16 June 2006, in Warsaw, Poland) was a Polish actor.

Selected filmography 
 Ostatni etap (1947)
 Miasto nieujarzmione (1950)
 Warszawska syrena (1955)
 Stawka większa niż życie (television series) (1967–1968)
 Chłopi (television series) (1967–1968)
 Lalka (television series) (1977)
 Kariera Nikodema Dyzmy (television series) (1980)
 Znachor (1981)
 Awantura o Basię (1995), (1996)

External links 
 Announcement of death (in Polish)
 

1917 births
2006 deaths
Male actors from Warsaw
Recipient of the Meritorious Activist of Culture badge